Yuriy Malyhin (born 29 April 1971 in Voroshylovhrad) is a former Soviet and Ukrainian footballer and Ukrainian football manager.

He is a son of Volodymyr Malyhin.

Following the 2014 Russian aggression against Ukraine, Malyhin serves as a football functionary on the Russian occupied territories.

External links
 
 

1971 births
Living people
Footballers from Luhansk
Soviet footballers
Ukrainian footballers
Association football goalkeepers
FC Shakhtar Stakhanov players
FC Zorya Luhansk players
FC Stal Alchevsk players
FC Mariupol players
FC Kristall Smolensk players
FC Dynamo Saint Petersburg players
FC Dynamo Stavropol players
FC Hirnyk Rovenky players
FC Polissya Zhytomyr players
FC Shakhtar Sverdlovsk players
Ukrainian Premier League players
FC Zorya Luhansk managers
FC Komunalnyk Luhansk managers
FC Hirnyk-Sport Horishni Plavni managers
FC Poltava managers
FC Nistru Otaci managers
Expatriate footballers in Russia
Ukrainian expatriate footballers
Expatriate football managers in Moldova
Ukrainian expatriate football managers
Moldovan Super Liga managers
FC Spartak Nizhny Novgorod players